Havila may refer to:

Havilan, a village in Iran
Havila Shipping